The 1988 European Weightlifting Championships were held in Cardiff, United Kingdom from 26 April to 3 May 1988. This was the 67th edition of the event. There were 175 men in action from 25 nations. The women competition were held in City of San Marino, San Marino. It was the 1st event for the women.

Medal summary

Men

Women
https://pl.wikipedia.org/wiki/Mistrzostwa_Europy_Kobiet_w_Podnoszeniu_Ci%C4%99%C5%BCar%C3%B3w_1988

Medal table
Ranking by Big (Total result) medals

References
Results (Chidlovski.net)
Панорама спортивного года 1988 / Сост. Ю. С. Лукашин — М.: Физкультура и спорт, 1989. 

European Weightlifting Championships
European Weightlifting Championships
European Weightlifting Championships
International weightlifting competitions hosted by the United Kingdom
Sports competitions in Cardiff